The Man and His Music is a 1986 compilation album by Sam Cooke, released posthumously. It debuted about a month after Cooke was inducted into the Rock and Roll Hall of Fame.

Critical reception

Bruce Eder of AllMusic writes, "There are better collections with all of these songs and more on them, but none handier than this in presenting every facet of Cooke's work -- the only flaw, if there is one, is the absence of one of the better tracks off of the Harlem Square live album."

Rolling Stones Steve Bloom writes, "The Man and His Music will probably just confirm what people already knew about Sam Cooke: he possessed a voice that could burn down the house, but he compromised it for stardom."

Track listing

Track information verified from the album's liner notes.

Charts

References

Sam Cooke compilation albums
1986 compilation albums
RCA Records compilation albums